Sandur may refer to:

 Sandur (landform), an outwash plain formed by meltwater from glaciers
 Sandur, India, a town in southern India
 Sandur (princely state)
 Sandur, Faroe Islands, a village in the Faroe Islands
 Sandur, Iraq, a village in northern Iraq.